Across the Bridge may refer to:

 "Across the Bridge" (short story), a 1938 short story by Graham Greene
 Across the Bridge (film), a 1957 British film, based on the short story
 "Across the Bridge" (Australian Playhouse), a 1966 Australian television play by Liane Keen